Lecanora gangaleoides is a species of crustose lichen in the family Lecanoraceae. It was described as new to science by William Nylander in 1872.

See also
List of Lecanora species

References

gangaleoides
Lichen species
Lichens described in 1872
Taxa named by William Nylander (botanist)